The following railroads operate in the U.S. state of North Dakota.

Common freight carriers
BNSF Railway (BNSF)
Canadian Pacific Railway (CP) through subsidiary Soo Line Railroad (SOO)
Dakota, Missouri Valley and Western Railroad (DMVW)
Dakota Northern Railroad (DN)
Northern Plains Railroad (NPR)
Operates the Mohall Railroad and Mohall Central Railroad
Red River Valley and Western Railroad (RRVW)
Yellowstone Valley Railroad (YSVR)

Private freight carriers
Cenex Harvest States Cooperatives

Passenger carriers

Amtrak (AMTK)

Defunct railroads

Electric
Devils Lake and Chautauqua Railway

Notes

References
North Dakota Public Service Commission, .  Retrieved March 10, 2005.

Notes

 
 
North Dakota
Railroads